The Gus Blass Department Store is a historic commercial building at 318-324 Main Street in Little Rock, Arkansas.  It is a seven-story masonry structure, built in 1912 to a design by George R. Mann, a leading Arkansas architect.  It was one of the first instances of two-way concrete slab construction in the nation, and was one of the first department stores in the state to be air conditioned (in 1936).  The Blass Department Store was for many years the city's largest department store, and remained in business here into the 1970s, ultimately becoming a part of the Dillard's department store chain before closing in 1972.

The building was listed on the National Register of Historic Places in 1986.

See also
National Register of Historic Places listings in Little Rock, Arkansas

References

Commercial buildings on the National Register of Historic Places in Arkansas
Buildings and structures completed in 1912
Buildings and structures in Little Rock, Arkansas
National Register of Historic Places in Little Rock, Arkansas
Historic district contributing properties in Arkansas
Defunct department stores based in Arkansas